Live.04 is Isis's fourth live release and the first to be composed of recordings from several different sources and eras. Many of the tracks are from audience bootleg recordings, and as such do not sound professionally recorded. The exception is the first track, recorded for WMBR Radio Boston. As with the rest of the live series, the CD version was self-released. The vinyl edition was handled, in this instance, by Robotic Empire.

Along with all Isis' other live albums, it is set to be re-released on July 12, 2011 in digital format, almost a full year after Isis' dissolution. It marks the fourth of the series released to a fortnightly schedule.

Track listing
All songs written by Isis unless otherwise noted.
 "Gentle Time" – 8:54
 WMBR, Boston, MA – 2001
 "Glisten" – 6:57
 The Troubadour, Los Angeles, CA – May 11, 2005
 "C.F.T. (New Circuitry and Continued Evolution)" – 8:02
 CBGB's, New York, NY – August 26, 2001
 "Celestial (The Tower)" – 10:49
 CBGB's, New York, NY – August 26, 2001
 "Improv 1 / Endless Nameless" (K. Cobain) – 8:01
 The Rotunda, Philadelphia, PA – July 6, 2001
 "False Light" – 8:30
 The Middle East Upstairs, Boston, MA – September 17, 2002
 "Weight" (instrumental version) – 12:25
 The Troubadour, Los Angeles, CA – May 11, 2005

Personnel
 Aaron Turner – vocals, guitar
 Jeff Caxide – bass guitar
 Bryant Clifford Meyer – electronics, guitar
 Michael Gallagher – guitar
 Aaron Harris – drums
 Justin Chancellor – bass guitar on "Weight"
 Troy Ziegler – djembe on "Weight"

References

External links 
 Live IV at Bandcamp (streamed copy where licensed)

Isis (band) live albums
Albums with cover art by Aaron Turner
2006 live albums